Salvation Army Centre, Teddington is a Salvation Army church at  27 Church Road, Teddington, in the London Borough of Richmond upon Thames. Meetings are held on Sundays at 10:30am.

From 1886 the Salvation Army met in a hall in Queen's Road, moving to their current site in 1914. They have used their existing premises since 1934.

References

External links
Official website

Churches in the London Borough of Richmond upon Thames
Teddington
Salvationism in England
Churches in Teddington